Marcos Madrid Mantilla (born 6 September 1986) is a Mexican table tennis player. He competed at the 2016 Summer Olympics in the men's singles event, in which he was eliminated in the first round by Wang Yang.

References

External links
 
 
 

1986 births
Living people
Mexican male table tennis players
Olympic table tennis players of Mexico
Table tennis players at the 2016 Summer Olympics
Sportspeople from Puebla
Pan American Games medalists in table tennis
Pan American Games silver medalists for Mexico
Pan American Games bronze medalists for Mexico
Table tennis players at the 2011 Pan American Games
Table tennis players at the 2015 Pan American Games
Medalists at the 2011 Pan American Games
People from Puebla (city)